Essential Standards is the third compilation album of songs by American jazz pianist/composer Vince Guaraldi released on June 30, 2009, in the U.S by Concord as part of their Original Jazz Classics series.

Background
Acting as a companion piece to Fantasy Records' 1980 Greatest Hits, Essential Standards includes additional songs from Guaraldi's Fantasy Records catalogue outside of his soundtrack recordings for Charles M. Schulz's Peanuts television specials.

Track listing

References

External links 
 Essential Standards at Discogs

2009 compilation albums
Fantasy Records compilation albums
Concord Records compilation albums
Albums produced by Vince Guaraldi
Vince Guaraldi albums
Vince Guaraldi compilation albums
Albums arranged by Vince Guaraldi
Cool jazz compilation albums
Mainstream jazz compilation albums